Bjarne Forchhammer (14 September 1903 – 3 April 1970) was a Danish film actor. He appeared in 25 films between 1933 and 1968. He was born in Germany and died in Denmark.

Filmography

Kongen bød (1938)
The Child (1940)
Vagabonden (1940)
Jeg har elsket og levet (1940)
Tante Cramers testamente (1941)
Peter Andersen (1941)
Afsporet (1942)
Forellen (1942)
Naar man kun er ung (1943)
Ebberød Bank (1943)
Biskoppen (1944)
Bedstemor går amok (1944)
Billet mrk. (1946)
Ta', hvad du vil ha' (1947)
John og Irene (1949)
For frihed og ret (1949)
Min kone er uskyldig (1950)
Susanne (1950)
Flemming og Kvik (1960)
Ullabella (1961)
Rififi in Stockholm (1961)
En blandt mange (1961)
Rikki og mændene (1962)
Det var en lørdag aften (1968)

External links

1903 births
1970 deaths
Danish male film actors
20th-century Danish male actors